Arabia Petraea or Petrea, also known as Rome's Arabian Province or simply Arabia, was a frontier province of the Roman Empire beginning in the 2nd century. It consisted of the former Nabataean Kingdom in Jordan, southern Levant, the Sinai Peninsula and northwestern Arabian Peninsula. Its capital was Petra. It was bordered on the north by Syria, on the west by Judaea (merged with Syria from AD 135) and Egypt, and on the south and east by the rest of Arabia, known as Arabia Deserta and Arabia Felix.

The territory was annexed by Emperor Trajan, like many other eastern frontier provinces of the Roman Empire, but held onto, unlike Armenia, Mesopotamia and Assyria, well after Trajan's rule, its desert frontier being called the Limes Arabicus. It produced the Emperor Philippus, who was born around 204. As a frontier province, it included a desert populated by Arabic tribes, and bordering the Parthian hinterland.

Though subject to eventual attack and deprivation by the  Parthians and Palmyrenes, it had nothing like the constant incursions faced in other areas on the Roman frontier, such as Germany and North Africa, or the entrenched cultural presence that defined the other more Hellenized eastern provinces.

Geography 

The geographic makeup of Arabia has some variation.  It includes the comparatively fertile Moab plateau, which received 200mm of annual rainfall, at the southernmost tip of which lies Petra which, along with Bostra (or Busra), together constitute the political foci of the province.

Inhospitability is the norm, though, and along with the desert proper that is the Sinai, the arid Negev, which extends north of the Sinai, is practically such.  Along with this are the coastal areas around the Red Sea; the badlands known as Hismā that develop to the north of that coast; and the ever-present rocky terrain.

Major cities 
Most of Arabia was sparsely populated, and its cities can be found concentrated to the north, toward the Jordan. The only major port is Aqaba, at the tip of the wide Gulf of Aqaba, a branch of the Red Sea. 

In AD 106, when Aulus Cornelius Palma Frontonianus was governor of Syria, the part of Arabia under the rule of Petra was absorbed into the Roman Empire as part of Arabia Petraea, and Petra became its capital.  Petra declined rapidly under Roman rule, in large part from the revision of sea-based trade routes. In 363, an earthquake destroyed many buildings and crippled the vital water management system. The old city of Petra was the capital of the Eastern Roman province of Palaestina III and many churches from the Byzantine period were excavated in and around Petra. In one of them, the Byzantine Church, 140 papyri were discovered, which contained mainly contracts dated from 530s to 590s, establishing that the city was still flourishing in the 6th century.

Petra served as the base for Legio III Cyrenaica, and the governor of the province would spend time in both cities, issuing edicts from both.

History

Roman conquest 
Before Roman control in 106 AD, the area had been ruled by Rabbel II, last king of the Nabataeans, who had ruled since 70 AD. When he died the Third Cyrenaica legion moved north from Egypt into Petra, while the Sixth Ferrata legion, a Syrian garrison unit, moved south to occupy Bostra. The conquest of Nabataea can be best described as casual, an act by Trajan to consolidate control of the area before acting on his designs for territory across the Tigris and eventually into Mesopotamia proper.

There is no evidence of any pretext for the annexation: Rabbel II had an heir by the name of Obodas and though there was little fighting (attested to by the fact that Trajan did not adopt the appellation "Arabicus"), there does seem to have been enough of a defeat to humiliate the Nabataeans.  The two cohorts that eventually found themselves in Arabia had sailed from Egypt to Syria in preparation for the action. Apart from some units of the Nabataean royal guard, this seems not to have been strongly resisted, as suggested by the fact that some Nabataean troops served as auxiliary Roman troops shortly after the conquest.

The conquest of Arabia was not officially celebrated until completion of the Via Nova Traiana. This road extended down the center of the province from Bostra to Aqaba.  It was not until the project was finished that coins, featuring Trajan's bust on the obverse and a camel on the reverse, appeared commemorating the acquisition of Arabia.  These coins were minted until 115, at which time the Roman imperial focus was turning farther eastward.

The road linked not only Bostra and Aqaba, which other than being a port does not seem to have held much significance to the imperial government, but also Petra, which sat at the center of the province, between the road's two termini. Though Trajan declared Bostra to be the capital of the province, he also awarded Petra the status of metropolis, as a sign that he agreed about its importance with his successor, Hadrian, who considered it to be dignified and historic.

In the 1960s and 1970s, evidence was discovered that Roman legions occupied Mada'in Salih under Trajan in the Hijaz mountain area of northeastern Arabia, increasing the extension of the Arabia Petraea province south.

Romanization 
With Roman conquest came the imposition of Latin and Greek in official discourse. This was standard for a province in Eastern Rome, but Arabia had far less of the history of Hellenization and Romanization than its neighbors, and the Greek language was little used before its introduction by the Romans. After the conquest, though, Greek was adopted popularly, as well as officially, practically supplanting Nabataean and Aramaic, as evidenced by inscriptions at Umm al Quttain. The occurrence of Latin in the province was rare and limited to such cases as the tomb inscription of Lucius Aninius Sextius Florentinus, governor in 127, and, somewhat paradoxically, in personal names.

Millar makes a case for a Graeco-Roman Hellenization in Arabia. It is an area, after all, that was not significantly hellenized during the rule of Alexander, and the locals originally spoke their native language, not Greek.  So with the introduction of Roman rule, along with many aspects of classic Roman socialization, such as public works and glorification of the military, came an introduction of some Greek cultural and social values.  Arabia acclimated to the new culture so fully that it seems the original linguistic groups faded away.  There were scattered Nabataean inscriptions during the period of imperial Roman rule.

The Era of Bostra, a year numbering system specific to the province, was introduced. Its year one began on the date corresponding to 22 March 106 AD.

Arabia during late Roman Empire 
When Avidius Cassius rebelled against what he believed was a deceased Marcus Aurelius, he received no support from Arabia province, overlooked by some historians likely due to the fact that Arabia did not have the wealth or political might of Syria.  Arabia responded similarly when the governor of Syria, Pescennius Niger, proclaimed himself emperor in 193.

When Septimius Severus came into power and stripped the Syrian city of Antioch of its status as Metropolis for its part in the rebellion and meted out punishment to any others who were unlucky enough to choose the wrong side, the Third Cyrenaica received the honorific "Severiana". In addition, the governor of Arabia, Publius Aelius Severianus Maximus, was allowed to continue in his post in reward for his loyalty. Syria was later split into two and Arabia was expanded to include the Lajat and Jebel Drūz, rough terrain south of Damascus, and also the birthplace of M. Julius Phillipus, better known as Philip the Arab.

Severus had enlarged a province that was already huge. He then proceeded to enlarge the empire through the conquest of Mesopotamia.  The transfer of the Leja’ and Jebel Drūz seemed to have been  part of a shrewd series of political acts on the emperor's part to consolidate control of the area before this conquest.  Arabia became the ideological power base for Septemius Severus in the Roman Near East.  The obvious need to mitigate and tame the power of the province of Syria, which had shown itself over and over to be a hotbed of rebellion, was then accomplished in three parts:  The reorganization of Syria into two political units, the reduction of its territory in favor of Arabia, and the marriage of the emperor to the shrewd Julia Domna.

Arabia became such a symbol of loyalty to Severus and the empire that during his war against Clodius Albinus, in Gaul, Syrian opponents propagated a rumour that the Third Cyrenaica had defected.  That it would matter to an issue in Gallia that a single legion in a backwater province on the other side of the empire would rebel indicates the political sway that Arabia had amassed.  Not a land of significant population, or resources or even strategic position, it had become a bedrock of Roman culture.  That it was an Eastern Roman culture did not seem to dilute this importance in the west.  It is precisely because Arabia had so little that it was able to define itself as Roman and that spurred its loyalty to Imperial Rome.

With Emperor Diocletian's restructuring of the empire in 284–305, Arabia province was enlarged to include parts of modern-day Israel. Arabia after Diocletian became a part of the Diocese of the East, which was part of the Prefecture of Oriens.

Byzantine rule 
As part of the Diocese of the East, Arabia became a frontline in the Byzantine-Sassanid Wars. In the 5th or 6th century it was transformed into Palaestina Salutaris.

Episcopal sees 
Ancient episcopal sees of the Roman province of Arabia listed in the Annuario Pontificio as titular sees :
{{columns-list|colwidth=30em|
 Adraa (Daraa)
 Bacatha in Arabia (ruins of Khirbet-El-Bascha?)
 Bosana (Syria) (Busan)
 'Bostra, the Metropolitan Archbishopric
 Canatha
 Constantia in Arabia (Buraq)
 Chrysopolis in Arabia
 Dionysias
 Erra (Es-Sanamein?, Aere?, Ire?)
 Esbus (Hesbân)
 Eutyme
 Gerasa (now Jerash)
 Maximianopolis in Arabia
 Medaba (now Madaba)
 Neapolis in Arabia
 Neila (ruins of Khirbet-En-Nila)
 Neve
 Parembolae in Arabia
 Phaena (Al-Masmiyah)
 Philippopolis in Arabia (Shahba)
 Zorava (Ezra')
}}

 See also 
 List of Roman governors of Arabia Petraea
 Arabian Peninsula in the Roman era
 Arabs
 Arabian Peninsula
 Pre-Islamic Arabia
 Petra

 Citations 

 General and cited references  
 G. W. Bowersock, Roman Arabia, (Harvard University Press, 1983) 
 Fergus Millar, Roman Near East'', (Harvard University Press, 1993)

External links 
 On the Via Nova Traiana, Virtual Karak Resources Project
 On the Limes Arabicus, Virtual Karak Resources Project

 
100s establishments in the Roman Empire
100s establishments
106 establishments
630s disestablishments in the Byzantine Empire
630s disestablishments
Ancient Levant
Arabia
Historical regions
History of Palestine (region)
Jordan in the Roman era
Late Roman Syria
Nabataea
Sinai Peninsula
States and territories disestablished in the 7th century